Oslo City FC is a sports club in Oslo, Norway, which was founded in 1987. The club has a football team who plays in the Third Division, after being relegated from the Second Division in 2010 when they finished 14th and last in its group. The club has also received some media attention because of its special style of play and his team have a great deal players with multi-cultural background .

Recent history 

{|class="wikitable"
|-bgcolor="#efefef"
! Season
! 
! Pos.
! Pl.
! W
! D
! L
! GS
! GA
! P
!Cup
!Notes
|-
|2008
|3. divisjon
|align=right |1
|align=right|22||align=right|18||align=right|4||align=right|0
|align=right|78||align=right|31||align=right|58
||First qualifying round
|Lost playoff for promotion
|-
|2009
|3. divisjon
|align=right bgcolor=#DDFFDD| 1
|align=right|22||align=right|19||align=right|1||align=right|2
|align=right|74||align=right|21||align=right|58
||
|Promoted to the 2. divisjon
|-
|2010
|2. divisjon
|align=right bgcolor="#FFCCCC"| 14
|align=right|26||align=right|5||align=right|4||align=right|17
|align=right|37||align=right|61||align=right|19
|First round
|Relegated to the 3. divisjon
|-
|2011 
|3. divisjon
|align=right |2
|align=right|24||align=right|16||align=right|3||align=right|5
|align=right|54||align=right|32||align=right|51
|First qualifying round
|
|-
|2012
|3. divisjon
|align=right |8
|align=right|26||align=right|11||align=right|1||align=right|14
|align=right|48||align=right|54||align=right|34
|First round
|
|-
|2013
|3. divisjon
|align=right |3
|align=right|26||align=right|17||align=right|4||align=right|5
|align=right|82||align=right|34||align=right|55
|First round
|
|}

References

External links 
 Official site

Football clubs in Oslo
Association football clubs established in 1987
1987 establishments in Norway